Puerto Marín Balmaceda Airport  is an airport serving Puerto Raúl Marín Balmaceda (es), a town in the Aysén Region of Chile. The town is on the eastern shore of a small peninsula that separates the Palena River and the Rodríguez River at their entry into the Gulf of Corcovado.

The airport is just south of the town. East approach and departure are over the water. There are hills east and west of the runway.

See also

Transport in Chile
List of airports in Chile

References

External links
OpenStreetMap - Puerto Marín Balmaceda
OurAirports - Puerto Marín Balmaceda
FallingRain - Puerto Marín Balmaceda Airport

Airports in Chile
Airports in Aysén Region